Mr. P is the first and only live album by stand-up comedian Patrice O'Neal. It was released posthumously on February 7, 2012, following the comic's death in November of the previous year. He had planned the release as the follow up to his Elephant in the Room special, and had completed work on the album before his death, except for the cover art, which is a composite created after O'Neal's illness, based on his description. The album debuted at #35 on the Billboard 200 and #1 on the Billboard Comedy Albums chart. The album also peaked at #76 on the Canadian Albums Chart.

Track listing
 "Intro" - 6:35
 "Can't Care" - 5:02
 "Making Lots of Money" - 6:34
 "T.S.A." - 3:38
 "Hate People Touching Me" - 4:27
 "Obama" - 2:09
 "Reparations" - 3:51
 "Race War" - 6:41
 "Tolu" - 4:51
 "White Women Are Pleasant" - 5:05
 "Black Women Get You Refunds" - 1:50
 "White Women Get Cold" - 4:10
 "Side Pussy" - 4:17
 "The Corporation" - 3:56
 "My Dogs" - 3:52
 "Start a Hoe, Stay a Hoe" - 2:01
 "I Like Hoes" - 5:19

References

2012 live albums
Live albums published posthumously
Patrice O'Neal albums
2010s comedy albums
Stand-up comedy albums
2010s spoken word albums
Spoken word albums by American artists
Live spoken word albums